Mount Gudmundson is a mainly ice-free mountain,  high, standing  northeast of Fault Bluff in the Cook Mountains of Antarctica. It was mapped by the United States Geological Survey from tellurometer surveys and Navy air photos, 1959–63, and was named by the Advisory Committee on Antarctic Names for Julian P. Gudmundson, a U.S. Navy explosive expert who wintered at Little America V in 1957. He blasted the foundation for the nuclear power plant at McMurdo Station during U.S. Navy Operation Deep Freeze, 1961.

References

External links

Mountains of Oates Land